2. deild is the third tier league of football in the Faroe Islands. It was founded in 1976 and is organized by the Faroe Islands Football Association. It was originally called 3. deild but became 2. deild after a reorganization of the Faroe Islands football league system in 2005.

History
The league was founded in 1943 and was named Meðaldeildin (The Middle Division): this was 1 year after the founding of the  Meistaradeildin, the original top level Faroe Islands football league. There was no promotion and relegation system at the time, and the two leagues operated separately from each other. This was partly because Meðaldeildin was mostly made up of B teams from the clubs in the Meistaradeildin. One year after all leagues had to be suspended due to the British occupation of the Faroe Islands. The league then resumed in 1945. From 1943 to 1975 it was called Meðaldeildin, then the league structure changed in 1976. The Meistaradeildin was renamed 1. deild and the Meðaldeildin was renamed 2. deild. Also from that season onwards, the top clubs in 2. deild were promoted to 1. deild. The first club to be promoted was Fram Tórshavn after they won the division for the first time in their history, though they finished bottom of 1. deild the following season and were relegated back into 2. deild. The latest change to the league was made in 2005, when 1. deild was renamed as Formuladeildin for sponsorship reasons; 2. Deild adopted the name of 1. Deild; the third tier was renamed 2. Deild and the fourth tier became 3. Deild.

It currently has 10 participating teams. At the end of each season, two teams are relegated and two promoted from what is now the fourth division, pending the fact that the winning team in any given division doesn't already have a senior team in the division it is being promoted to. In such cases the team that finished second will be promoted in its stead. If a team is relegated to a division where one of its teams are already playing, the second best team will move one division down, thereby saving another team from relegation.

At the end of the 2008 season, Fram, who were set to be renamed FC Hoyvík for the 2009 season and AB II finished in the  promotion places. Fram (now FC Hoyvík) were promoted to 1. deild, while AB II would only be promoted if their 1st team finished in one of the promotion places in 1. deild. AB's first team eventually won promotion into the Vodafonedeildin, finishing runners-up in 1.Deild. However, AB II were denied promotion to 1.deild and MB Midvágur who finished 3rd in 2.Deild, were promoted instead. Because AB II who finished 2nd, had used illegal players. Though there is still an ongoing debate whether they finished 2nd or 3rd and which team should have been promoted.
The following season in 2009 MB Midvágur finished bottom in 1.Deild, only picking up 8 points and were relegated back into 2.deild. Meanwhile AB Argir II won the 2.deild in 2009 and were promoted to 1.deild.

2. deild seasons

{|class="wikitable" style="text-align:center;"
|-
!Season
!Winner
!Runner-up
!3rd Place
!Top goalscorer
|-
|1976
|KÍ II
|
|
|
|-
|1977
|Royn Hvalba
|
|
|
|-
|1978
|SÍ Sørvágur
|
|
|
|-
|1979
|TB II
|
|
|
|-
|1980
|Leirvík ÍF
|
|
|
|-
|1981
|SÍF Sandavágur
|
|
|
|-
|1982
|SÍ Sumba
|
|
|
|-
|1983
|HB II
|
|
|
|-
|1984
|VB II
|
|
|
|-
|1985
|EB Eiði
|
|
|
|-
|1986
|B71 Sandoy
|
|
|
|-
|1987
|SÍ Sørvágur
|Skála ÍF
|HB Tórshavn II
|
|-
|1988
|GÍ Gøta II
|B36 Tórshavn II
|TB Tvøroyri II
|
|-
|1989
|Fram Tórshavn
|Royn Hvalba
|ÍF Fuglafjørður II
|
|-
|1990
|KÍ Klaksvík II
|Streymur
|TB Tvøroyri II
|
|-
|1991
|HB Tórshavn II
|EB Eiði
|B36 Tórshavn II
|
|-
|1992
|B68 Toftir II
|NSÍ Runavík II
|Streymur
|
|-
|1993
|HB Tórshavn II
|NSÍ Runavík II
|ÍF Fuglafjørður II
|
|-
|1994
|HB Tórshavn III
|FS Vágar II
|GÍ Gøta II
| Rodmund Rasmussen (FS Vágar II, 24 goals)
|-
|1995
|B68 Toftir II
|Skála ÍF
|B71 Sandoy II
| Petur Gaardlykke (B68 II, 27 goals)
|-
|1996
|Royn Hvalba
|B36 Tórshavn II
|GÍ Gøta II
| Odd Eliasen (ÍF II, 21 goals)
|-
|1997
|GÍ Gøta II
|NSÍ Runavík II
|VB Vágur II
| Heini Heinason (GÍ II, 28 goals)
|-
|1998
|Skála ÍF
|GÍ Gøta III
|B68 Toftir II
| Bogi Gregersen (Skála, 19 goals)
|-
|1999
|B36 Tórshavn II
|B68 Toftir II
|ÍF Fuglafjørður II
| Tórálvur Poulsen (B36 II, 18 goals)
|-
|2000
|Skála ÍF
|B36 Tórshavn III
|B71 Sandoy II
| Svend Eli Poulsen (AB, 22 goals)
|-
|2001
|VB Vágur II
|Royn Hvalba
|ÍF Fuglafjørður II
| Allan Michelsen (Royn, 18 goals)
|-
|2002
|AB Argir
|B68 Toftir II
|GÍ Gøta II
| Johnny Samuelsen (AB, 11 goals)
|-
|2003
|Royn Hvalba
|GÍ Gøta II
|EB/Streymur II
| Gisli Sveinbjørnsson (Royn, 18 goals)
|-
|2004
|GÍ Gøta II
|HB Tórshavn II
|SÍ Sørvágur
| Heini Gaard (HB II, 20 goals)
|-
|2005
|SÍ Sørvágur
|KÍ Klaksvík II
|B68 Toftir II
| Jens Erik Rasmussen (SÍ, 14 goals)
|-
|2006
|NSÍ Runavík II
|B36 Tórshavn II
|EB Streymur II
| Fróði Jóanesarson (NSÍ II, 15 goals)
|-
|2007
|B68 Toftir II
|GÍ Gøta II
|EB/Streymur II
| Leif Niclasen (EB/Streymur II, 16 goals)
|-
|2008
|Fram Tórshavn
|AB Argir II
|MB Miðvágur
| Jørgen Meitilberg (Fram, 20 goals)
|-
|2009
|AB Argir II
|07 Vestur II
|EB/Streymur II
| Karl Jóhan Djurhuus (07 Vestur II, 16 goals)
|-
|2010
|Skála ÍF
|FC Hoyvík II
|07 Vestur II
| Karl Jóhan Djurhuus (07 Vestur II, 18 goals)
|-
|2011
|KÍ Klaksvík II
|B68 Toftir II
|B36 Tórshavn II
| Bjarki Vágstún (KÍ II, 14 goals) Búi í Hjøllum (B68 II, 14 goals)
|-
|2012
|B36 Tórshavn II
|TB Tvøroyri II|Giza Hoyvík
| Jákup T. Joensen (B36 II, 19 goals)
|-
|2013
|AB Argir II|NSÍ Runavík II|Giza Hoyvík
| Debes Danielsen (NSÍ II, 20 goals)
|-
|2014
|MB Miðvágur|B71 Sandoy|Giza Hoyvík
| Otto Jacobsen (MB, 18 goals)
|-
|2015
|HB Tórshavn II|Giza Hoyvík|KÍ Klaksvík III
| Lindi Gardar (KÍ III, 21 goals)
|-
|2016
|B36 Tórshavn II|ÍF Fuglafjørður II|Skála II
| Nenad Šarić (ÍF II, 16 goals)
|-
|2017
|B71 Sandoy|Skála II|Víkingur III
| Símin Hansen (B71, 17 goals)
|-
|2018
|EB/Streymur II|B36 Tórshavn II|Undrið FF
| Andras Dalbø (Víkingur III, 17 goals)
|-
|2019
|FC Hoyvík|AB Argir II|FC Suðuroy
| Andras Dalbø (Víkingur III, 13 goals) Dávid Lisberg (FC Suðuroy, 13 goals) Hans Jákup Annfinsson (AB II, 13 goals) Hugin Ferber (FC Hoyvík, 13 goals)
|-
|2020
|Skála II|FC Suðuroy|EB/Streymur II
| Ari Poulsen (Suðuroy, 20 goals)
|-
|2021
|Undrið FF|ÍF II
|07 Vestur II
| Hugin Ferber (FC Hoyvík, 19 goals)
|}
Clubs in bold were promoted.

Titles by team

In bold' clubs currently playing in 2. deild. In italics'' the clubs that no longer exist.

References

External links
2. deild at Faroe Soccer 

   
3
Far